Strella (international title: A Woman's Way) is a 2009 Greek drama film written and directed by Panos H. Koutras. The plot centres around the relationship between a 45-year-old ex-convict and a 25-year-old transgender woman.

Plot
Yiorgos (Yiannis Kokiasmenos) is released from prison after 14 years of incarceration for a murder he committed in his small Greek village. He spends his first night out in a cheap hotel in Athens. There he meets Strella (Mina Orfanou), a young transgender prostitute. They spend the night together and soon they fall in love. But the past is catching up with Yiorgos. With Strella on his side he will have to find a new way out.

Production
The film was shot on location in Athens and Peloponnese. The role of Strella was performed by the amateur actress Mina Orfanou, who is a trans woman.

Awards
The film was premiered in the 59th Berlin International Film Festival - Section Panorama - in February 2009 and has participated since in more than 20 international film festivals all over the world. It was one of the 48 films nominated for the European Film Awards in 2009.

Strella won four awards of the eleven it was nominated for, including best actress and art direction, at the first Hellenic Film Academy awards ceremony in 2010.

Cast
Mina Orfanou ..... Strella
Yiannis Kokiasmenos ..... Yiorgos
Minos Theoharis ..... Alex
Betty Vakalidou ..... Mary
Akis Ioannou ..... Wilma
Argiris Kavidas ..... Nikos
Kostas Siradakis ..... Antonis
Yiorgos Mazis ..... Kolokousis

References

External links

Memento Films - French distributor
Films Distribution - world sales 
Official blog in Greek
AlloCine
EcranLarge

2009 drama films
2009 LGBT-related films
2009 films
Greek drama films
2000s Greek-language films
Greek LGBT-related films
Films about trans women
Films shot in Athens